CFCA was the first regularly broadcasting licensed radio station in Toronto and was one of the first in Canada. Owned by the Toronto Daily Star it is notable for hosting the first live play-by-play ice hockey broadcast on February 8, 1923. The station went on the air in June 1922 and closed permanently in 1933.

Origins on 9AH
Toronto Daily Star owner Joseph E. Atkinson had an early interest in the potential of radio as a promotional device for the newspaper. In early 1922, the Star made arrangements with the Canadian Independent Telephone Company (CITCo) to broadcast a live concert over CITCo's experimental station, 9AH. On March 28, 1922 at 8 p.m., the Star made its first concert broadcast over 9AH at 450 metres (666 kHz) from CITCo's studio on the top floor of the General Electric factory at Wallace Avenue and Ward Street (close to Lansdowne Avenue and Bloor Street West). Performers included Luigi Romanelli's Orchestra, cellist Boris Hambourg, pianist Alberto Guerrero, and violinist Henri Czaplinski. The broadcast was announced, produced, and directed by Dr. Charles A. Culver of CITCo.

The broadcast, one of the first of live musical entertainment in Canada, was heard by the approximately 1,000 radio hobbyists in Toronto who owned crystal radio sets as well as by an audience at the Christie Street Military Hospital, where a radio receiver had been set up, and by an audience of over 1,100 gathered at the Masonic Temple who heard the transmission on a radio receiver set up on the stage. The broadcast was heard as far away as Napanee, Ontario, Georgian Bay, and upstate New York.

The success of the broadcast led the Star to commission a series of 19 concerts that were transmitted from April to mid-June 1922 over 9AH. As well, the Star, beginning April 10, 1922, broadcast a daily half-hour program at 7 p.m. on 450 metres with content varying from financial and sports bulletins, guest speakers, live music, bedtime children's stories read by a librarian, and a political bulletin telegraphed from The Star's correspondent in Ottawa.

The Star's radio service also became the first in Canada to broadcast a church service when it carried the Easter morning service conducted by Reverend W.A. Cameron at Bloor Street Baptist Church. Cameron would go on to broadcast Sunday morning sermons over the CFCA for a decade making him one of the best known preachers in Canada.

Launch of CFCA
During this period, the Star applied for and received one among the first batch of 62 commercial radio licenses issued by the Department of Marine and Fisheries which, at the time, was responsible for radio. CFCA was licensed to broadcast on 400 metres (equivalent to 750 kHz) and began broadcasting on June 22, 1922 from studios in the Toronto Daily Star building at 18-20 King Street West. A steel transmitter had been installed on top of the building and a radio van was acquired which would roam Toronto parks and other public areas in order to broadcast CFCA's signal over loudspeakers in order to encourage the purchase of radio receivers. On February 8, 1923, the first live play-by-play hockey broadcast was made when Toronto Daily Star sports reporter Norman Albert called the third period of an Ontario Hockey Association intermediate playoff game at Arena Gardens between North Toronto and Midland The broadcast was successful and, on February 14, 1923, a professional hockey game carried on CFCA between the Toronto St. Pats and the Ottawa Senators became the first NHL game to be broadcast on radio. On February 16, 1923 (according to some sources), his colleague Foster Hewitt, called an OHA game between the Toronto Argonaut Rowing Club and the Kitchener Greenshirts which went into three periods of overtime. Hewitt would take over from Albert as CFCA's sports announcer and continue to broadcast live hockey games on CFCA from Arena Gardens as the Toronto St. Pats became the Toronto Maple Leafs on a programme that would evolve into Hockey Night in Canada after the team moved to Maple Leaf Gardens. Hewitt would also announce horse racing from Woodbine Racetrack, one of the first such broadcasts in the world, along with other sporting events.

In August 1922, as part of "Radio Year" at the Canadian National Exhibition, CFCA in co-operation with CITCo and its station CKCE (formerly 9AH) constructed a Radio Building to display radio equipment, as well as setting up loudspeakers over which CFCA and CKCE's special broadcasts of speech and music could be heard for 8 hours a day in order to expose the general public to radio broadcasts and encourage them to purchase radio receivers. As part of these special demonstrations, CFCA initiated regular newscasts and weather bulletins.

Notable broadcasts included live election results coverage with the Radio Car and loudspeakers in various locations around as well as outside of Toronto being used so that crowds could gather to hear the results. The first such broadcast was of the British general election of November 15, 1922 followed by the Toronto municipal elections held on January 1, 1923, and live coverage of the June 25, 1923 Ontario general election results, as well as coverage of federal election results in 1925 and 1926. Election results broadcasts including use of the Radio Car and loudspeakers in multiple locations around as well as outside of Toronto being used so that crowds could gather to hear the results. Other notable broadcasts occurred in February 1924, when CFCA was requested by Canadian Press to broadcast summaries of CP wire dispatches to provincial newspapers as telegraph and telephone wires had been downed in a storm. These broadcasts over one particular weekend also corrected erroneous rumours of the death of Canadian prime minister William Lyon Mackenzie King, which otherwise would not have been corrected until newspapers resumed publishing on Monday. In 1925, the station experimented with remote control broadcasting in order to broadcast the tercentenary celebration of Samuel de Champlain from Orillia by long-distance telephone, and in 1928, CFCA became one of the first North American stations to re-broadcast short wave transmissions from Europe, first - from the BBC's 2LO in London, England, and again two weeks later when it relayed a program from Australia and a speech from the Prince of Wales in London.

CFCA hired Hart House musical director Reginald Stewart, to create and lead Canada's first radio orchestra, consisting of 50 musicians, for the station's regular dance program, Hour of Good Music.

According to a modern Toronto Star article on the station: "A typical broadcasting day for CFCA in 1923 began at noon with a weather report. From 2:30 to 3:30 p.m. there were agricultural reports, news and music. Closing stock market figures and late-day news were aired from 5:30 to 6 p.m. From 8 to 9 every evening, there was a live concert."

In 1924, CFCA's studios moved to the top of the Procter & Gamble building at Yonge Street and St. Clair Avenue.

CNR Radio, Canada's first radio network, leased time on CFCA as a phantom radio station operating with the call letters CNRT, until the network disbanded in 1932. While leasing CFCA's transmitter and frequency, CNRT would broadcast from its own studio located in the King Edward Hotel.

While other stations in Toronto were given licenses in Toronto, none would begin regular broadcasts until 1925 and CKCE, owned by CITCo as the successor of 9AH, broadcast only intermittently before going off the air permanently in 1924. As a result, CFCA enjoyed several years of almost exclusive radio coverage in the city competing only with radio stations from the United States. From 1925 to 1928, however, several other stations when on the air and due to the technology of the period, had to share frequencies by broadcasting at different times of the day. Due to seniority, CFCA was able to obtain a prime time evening time slot for its broadcasts. In 1928, CFCA was given exclusive rights over 770 kHz allowing it to extend its broadcast schedule. However, the rival Conservative Toronto Telegram newspaper, which broadcast on CKGW, accused the pro-Liberal Party Daily Star of benefiting from favouritism. The resulting controversy led the Liberal government to create the Aird Commission to investigate the state of radio in Canada and recommend policy. In 1929, the Aird Commission recommended a national radio policy which would cancel all private radio licenses and instead create a  state-owned monopoly that would operate a public radio network along the lines of the British Broadcasting Corporation. Atkinson and the Star endorsed the proposals.

Decline
CFCA fell behind its competitors due to Atkinson's hesitance to invest in new equipment and facilities for the station, as he believed that the Aird Commission's recommendations would be implemented bringing privately owned radio stations to an end. Plans for a new state of the art studio to be constructed in the Daily Star′s new headquarters, which opened in 1929, never came to fruition, resulting in the station failing to keep pace with the latest technological developments. The station's transmission power remained at 100 watts while rival CKGW, which was utilized by the Toronto Telegram newspaper, was transmitting at 10,000 Watts by the end of the decade.

Mackenzie King's Liberal government was defeated by the Conservatives led by R.B. Bennett. When Bennett's government passed a Broadcasting Act in 1932, a national public broadcaster in the form of the Canadian Radio Broadcasting Commission was created. The Act did not ban private radio stations, however it restricted their power to 100 Watts. CFCA ceased operations a year later, on September 1, 1933, with Atkinson declaring that the Star had no interest in competing with a public broadcaster. Additionally, the cost of updating CFCA's antiquated equipment had risen to $100,000 by 1933 which given the restriction on the station's transmitter power, would have appeared to be a poor investment of resources during the Great Depression.

After the closure of CFCA, the Star remained involved in radio until 1946 by providing content such as news bulletins to CRCT, the Toronto affiliate of the new Canadian Radio Broadcasting Commission and continued to do so when CRCT became CBL, the flagship of the Canadian Broadcasting Corporation when it succeeded the CRBC in 1937.

In 1947, the Star considered re-entering radio broadcasting by applying for an early FM radio license but did not end up pursuing the initiative.

The AM 770 frequency in Toronto is occupied by WTOR, a daytime-only border blaster station licensed to and broadcasting from Youngstown, New York (state). Under the North American Regional Broadcasting Agreement, CFCA (had it survived until 1941) would have been required to move up to AM 780, a frequency that is not occupied in the Toronto market.

References

fca
fca
Radio stations established in 1922
1922 establishments in Ontario
1933 disestablishments in Ontario
Radio stations disestablished in 1933
Toronto Star
FCA
CNR Radio